Puntarenas Estuary and Associated Mangrove Swamps Wetland, is a protected area in Costa Rica, managed under the Central Pacific Conservation Area, it was created in 2006 by decree 33327-MINAE.

References 

Nature reserves in Costa Rica
Protected areas established in 2006